Tioman Island is a mukim and an island in Rompin District, Pahang, Malaysia. It has seven villages, the largest and most populous being Kampung Tekek on the central western coast. The densely forested island is sparsely inhabited, and is surrounded by numerous coral reefs, making it a popular scuba diving, snorkelling, and surfing spot. There are many resorts and chalets for tourists around the island, which has duty-free status. 

In the 1970s, TIME Magazine selected Tioman as one of the world's most beautiful islands.

The island is part of Pahang territory. However, it is geographically closer to mainland Johor than to mainland Pahang and is accessed via ferry service from the Johorean coastal town of Mersing. Within Tioman Island there are seven kampungs: Salang, Air Batang, Tekek, Paya, Genting, Mukut and Juara. The telephone numbers in Tioman start with 09-413, 09-419, 09-582, 09-583 and 09-584.

History

Tioman has been used for thousands of years by Austronesian fishermen as an essential navigation point and a source of fresh water and wood. During the past thousand years, it has played host to Chinese, Arab, and European trading ships, and often Chinese porcelain shards can be found on beaches around the island.

In more recent history, Tioman played host to both the British and the Japanese navies during the Second World War. As a result, the waters around the island are littered with war remains, including HMS Repulse and HMS Prince of Wales.

Tioman island does not allow buildings to have more than three stories. Tioman Island is to be granted municipality status soon.

Nature
The marine area around Tioman Island and eight other nearby islands have been declared as marine parks and marine reserves.

Apart from its diverse marine life, the inland rainforest area was protected in 1972 as the Pulau Tioman Wildlife Reserve. There are several protected species of mammals on the island, including the binturong, long-tailed macaque, slow loris, black giant squirrel, red giant flying squirrel, mouse deer, brush-tailed porcupine, and common palm civet, from a total of 45 species of mammals and 138 species of birds, including the majestic frigatebird. Moreover, Tioman has species that are endemic to its shores. The Tioman walking catfish Clarias batu can be seen on rainforest walks. Kajang slender litter frog is only known from Mount Kajang.

Tioman's corals have been affected by a mass bleaching event in 2010 whereby the island lost a significant portion of its live coral cover. That resulted in many corals turning a dull white colour and some even fragmenting into pieces of dead coral skeleton. The 2016 bleaching event only just touched on Tioman's Coral Reefs, and as such, the coral has remained in good and healthy condition.

Tourist attractions

Tioman Island
 Tioman Airport
 Panuba Bay
 Salang
 Tekek Village
 Minang Cove - The only cove of Tioman Island
 Asah Waterfall
 Bagus Place Retreat - The most eco-friendly area on Tioman Island
 Juara Turtle Project - volunteer sea turtle and environmental conservation
 Golden City - part of Salang village
 Air Batang - also known as ABC

Around Tioman
 Pulo Jehat
 Tulai Island
 Three Little Islands
 Sepoi Island
 Labas Island
 Soyak Island

Climate

Politics
Tioman Island lends its name to the state constituency of Tioman, comprising the island and part of the Rompin District including the town of Kuala Rompin. Its representative to the State Legislative Assembly is Mohd. Johari Hussain from UMNO-Barisan Nasional. Its representative to the Malaysian Parliament is Hasan Ariffin, also from UMNO-Barisan Nasional.

Non-governmental organisations
 Juara Turtle Project- volunteer sea turtle and environmental conservation

Transportation

Air
The island houses the Tioman Airport with flights from Subang.

Water
The island is served by ferries from Mersing, Johor and Tanjung Gemok, Pahang. Both are located in Malaysia. Currently, two ferry companies are operating in both jetties. You can purchase the ticket at the counter book directly from their respective website to secure your seats in advance.

1. Bluewater Ferry - bluewater.my

2. Cata Ferry - cataferry.com

3. Jetty Location - Google Map

Legend

According to legend, Tioman Island is the resting place of a beautiful dragon princess. Whilst flying to visit her prince in Singapore, this beautiful maiden stopped to seek solace in the crystal-clear waters of the South China Sea. Enraptured by the charms of the place, she decided to discontinue her journey. By taking the form of an island, she pledged to offer shelter and comfort to passing travellers.

Local mythology claims that the island is the embodiment of the mighty dragon Sri Gumom. The dragon was on his way to visit his sister Gunung Linga (Lingin Peak). Still, the great Sri Rama forbade the meeting, and Sri Gumom was turned into a stone and fell into the deep sea where he now remains, frozen in eternity as this beautiful island with its distinctive topography.

Radio and television

Radio
Community radio within Tioman:
FM 90.0
FM 96.8 (Pahang FM) - owned by Radio Televisyen Malaysia
FM 100.7 Nasional FM
FM 103.2 (Airport radio)
FM 104.0 (Tioman community radio)
FM 104.1
From Malaysian mainland:
 FM 88.3 Minnal FM - owned by Radio Televisyen Malaysia
 FM 89.1 Ai FM - owned by Radio Televisyen Malaysia
 FM 90.1 Radio Klasik - owned by Radio Televisyen Malaysia
 FM 92.1 Johor FM - owned by Radio Televisyen Malaysia
 FM 92.9 (TraXX FM) - owned by Radio Televisyen Malaysia
 FM 102.5 Best FM

Television
TV1 - Channel 50 (Temporarily unavailable)
TV2 - Channel 53 (Temporarily unavailable) - Currently broadcasting on Channel 11
TV3 - Channel 32
NTV7 - 
8TV - Channel 7
TV9 - Channel 9
TV Alhijrah - Channel 40

Local:
TV5 - Channel 5

See also
Tioman Airport
List of islands of Malaysia
List of islands in the South China Sea

References

External links

 
 Tioman Island Travel Information Website
 Tourism Malaysia - Tioman Island
 The Biodiversity of Pulau Tioman, Peninsular Malaysia (Supplement 6 of the Raffles Bulletin of Zoology)
 Tioman island Travel Informations